With Force Peru is a Peruvian political party founded in March 1995. The party participated in the 2006 Peruvian national election under the presidential candidacy of Pedro Koechlin Von Stein.
At the legislative elections held on 9 April 2006, the party won less than 1% of the popular vote and no seats in the Congress of the Republic. The party subsequently lost its registration.

External links
With Force Peru Official Site

1995 establishments in Peru
Centrist parties in South America
Green parties in South America
Political parties established in 1995
Political parties in Peru